Nancy Lee may refer to:

Nancy Lee (writer) (born 1970), Canadian writer
Nancy Lee (producer) (c 1970), Canadian sports journalist and television producer
Nancy Lee Grahn (born 1958), an American soap actress
Nancy Y. Lee, American radiation oncologist 
Nancy Johnson (born Nancy Elizabeth Lee, 1935), American politician
Nancy Lee, a racehorse which won the 1921 Kentucky Oaks